Philippa "Pip" Karmel (born 27 March 1963) is an Australian filmmaker. As a film editor, she has worked exclusively with director Scott Hicks in a notable collaboration from 1988 through 2007; their work together includes the 1996 film Shine. She has directed and written several films, including Me Myself I (2000), which was released internationally.

Early career
Karmel is the daughter of Peter Karmel, who was an Australian economist, professor, and university administrator. She studied visual arts in Adelaide. She was an assistant editor in the mid-1980s. She worked for editor Andrew Prowse on several films including Call Me Mr. Brown (1985), which was Scott Hicks' first feature film. She subsequently studied film directing and editing at the Australian Film Television and Radio School. She interrupted her studies to edit Hicks' feature Sebastian and the Sparrow (1988), which was her first feature credit as an editor. Her graduate film was Sex Rules (1989), a short film.

Television and Shine
In the early 1990s Karmel worked primarily as a director and writer. She directed an episode, The Long Ride, for the Australian television program Under the Skin; the episode won the Australian Film Institute Award for Best Tele-feature. Hicks persuaded Karmel to return to editing for the film, Shine, which Hicks was directing and had co-written. Shine  (1996) has become Hicks' most recognized film; it is based on the early life of David Helfgott, who became a concert pianist following several years of institutionalization for mental illness. In his Variety review, David Stratton wrote, "Securing the musician's cooperation was obviously crucial to Jane Scott's accomplished production, which is also distinguished by Geoffrey Simpson's fine camerawork and Pip Karmel's editing, the latter skillfully shaping a wealth of material into a fast-paced, compelling narrative." Karmel has now edited several additional films with Hicks.

Me Myself I
Karmel worked throughout the 1990s on the film Me Myself I (2000), which she wrote and directed. Karmel's script explores the choices made by an unmarried woman who has become a successful journalist; in the film, the woman enters an "alternate reality" in which she is married to a former beau and has three children. The film was mainly seen in Australia, but was internationally distributed and widely reviewed. Roger Ebert and other critics have emphasized Rachel Griffiths' performance in the lead, but Andrew Sarris noted in The New York Observer, "In any event, Ms. Karmel, whether as erstwhile writer, editor, or maker of short films, has earned the right to a long and fruitful directorial career on the strength of Me Myself I, one of the most striking feature-film debuts ever."

Screenplays in development
Karmel has written a screenplay for a film adaptation of Geraldine Brooks' 2001 novel, Year of Wonders, which is a story of a 17th-century plague year in an English village. As of 2012, this film, which Karmel is slated to direct, is "in development".

Karmel and Vincent Sheehan wrote a screenplay for a comedy What Alice Forgot, and in 2012 received a grant to support further development of a film.

Awards
Karmel's editing of Shine (1996) was nominated for the Academy Award for Best Film Editing, the BAFTA Award for Best Editing, and an American Cinema Editors Eddie Award, and it won the Australian Film Institute Award for Best Achievement in Editing. For Me Myself I (2000), Karmel was nominated for the Australian Film Institute Award for Best Direction and for Best Screenplay.

Filmography
This filmography is based on the Internet Movie Database, and incorporates referenced additions to that listing.

Editor
Ana Who (documentary) (Karmel, 1984).
Sebastian and the Sparrow (TV) (Hicks, 1988).
Shine (Hicks, 1996).
The Ultimate Athlete (documentary, Hicks, 1996).
Hearts in Atlantis (Hicks, 2001).
No Reservations (Hicks, 2007).

Director
Ana Who (documentary) (1984)
Sex Rules (short) (1989). Won the Jury Prize at the ATOM (Australian Teachers of Media) Awards.
Fantastic Futures (short) (1991). Won Gold Award of the New York Film Festival.
The Long Ride (1993) (episode of the television series Under the Skin, written by Tony Ayres). Won Australian Film Institute Award for Best Tele-feature.
Me Myself I (2000). Karmel also wrote the screenplay.

References

Further reading

Australian film editors
Australian film directors
Australian women film directors
Australian screenwriters
Living people
1963 births
Australian Film Television and Radio School alumni
Australian women film editors